The Girl Guides Association of Thailand (GGAT) is the national Guiding organization of Thailand. It served 28,030 members (as of 2003). Founded in 1957, the girls-only organization became a full member of the World Association of Girl Guides and Girl Scouts in 1963.

Program

Sections
The association is divided in four sections according to age:
Littlebirds – ages 4 to 6
Bluebirds – ages 7 to 11
Guides – ages 12 to 15
Senior Guides – ages 16 to 20.

Guide Promise
On my honour I promise:
To do my duty to my country, my religion and the King;
To help other people at all times;
To obey the Guide Law.

Guide Law
A Guide's honour is to be trusted.
A Guide is loyal.
A Guide's duty is to be useful and to help others.
A Guide is a friend to all and a sister to every other Guide.
A Guide is courteous.
A Guide is a friend to animals.
A Guide obeys orders.
A Guide smiles and sings under all difficulties.
A Guide is thrifty.
A Guide is pure in thought, word and deed.

Emblems

See also
The National Scout Organization of Thailand

References

External links
 Basic information

World Association of Girl Guides and Girl Scouts member organizations
Scouting and Guiding in Thailand
Youth organizations established in 1957
1957 establishments in Thailand